Shirley Neil Pettis (July 12, 1924 – December 30, 2016) was an American politician who served as a U.S. representative from California between 1975 and 1979. She was first elected to fill the seat after her husband, Jerry Pettis, died in office.

Early life and career
Born Shirley Neil McCumber on July 12, 1924 in Mountain View, California, Pettis attended elementary schools in Berkeley, California from 1931 to 1932, and Berrien Springs, Michigan, from 1933 to 1937. She graduated from Andrews Academy in 1942. She attended Andrews University from 1942 to 1943, and the University of California, Berkeley from 1944 to 1945.

She was a co-founder and manager of Audio-Digest Foundation from 1950 to 1953, and a newspaper columnist for the Sun-Telegram, San Bernardino, California, from 1967 to 1970. Pettis served as vice president of the Republican Congressional Wives Club, 1975. She died in December 2016 at the age of 92.

Tenure in Congress
Pettis was elected as a Republican to the Ninety-fourth Congress. She won the special election that was held to fill the vacancy caused by the death of her husband, United States Representative Jerry Pettis.
She was subsequently reelected to the Ninety-fifth Congress (April 29, 1975 – January 3, 1979). She was not a candidate for reelection to the Ninety-sixth Congress in 1978.

While a Member of Congress she served first on the House Interior Committee and then the House Foreign Affairs Committee. She secured passage of her late husband's California Desert Protection Act and the Joshua Tree Wilderness Act legislation.

After Congress
She served as vice president, Women's Research and Education Institute, Washington, D.C. from 1980 to 1981.

She served as member of the Arms Control and Disarmament Commission from 1981 to 1983, and the Commission on Presidential Scholars from 1990 to 1992.
She served as member of the board of directors, Kemper National Insurance Companies from 1979 to 1997.

See also
 Women in the United States House of Representatives

References

1924 births
2016 deaths
American Seventh-day Adventists
Andrews University alumni
Female members of the United States House of Representatives
Journalists from California
Republican Party members of the United States House of Representatives from California
University of California, Berkeley alumni
Women in California politics